The 2006 NSW Premier League season was the sixth season of the revamped National Premier Leagues NSW.

The 2006 regular season began on Friday, 17 February 2006 in a match between Manly United and APIA Leichhardt Tigers. It concluded with Round 18 being played out on Sunday, 25 June 2006. The finals began on 1 July 2006, culminating with the grand final on 16 July 2006. The match was played at Marconi Stadium at 3pm with Sydney United FC being crowned premiers after defeating regular season champions Blacktown City Demons FC 4–0.

During the course of the season, all Premier League, Super League and Division teams were involved in the Statewide Cup, an equivalent to the English FA Cup with teams competing in a series of elimination games. Blacktown City Demons FC also won this competition defeating APIA Leichhardt Tigers 2–1 in the cup final.

Clubs
Teams promoted from Super League:
(After the end of the 2004–05 season.)
 None

Teams relegated to Super League:
(After the end of the 2004–05 season.)
 Bonnyrigg White Eagles FC
 St George FC
 Rockdale City Suns FC
 Penrith Nepean United FC
 Central Coast United
 Sydney Crescent Star

Regular season

League table

Results

Finals series
After the home and away season, the finals series began with the top four teams competing for the champions trophy. The finals series used a Page playoff system. The winner of the finals series, Sydney United FC was crowned as the NSW Premier League champions.

Standard cup rules – such as extra time and penalty shootouts were used to decide drawn games.

Semi-finals

Preliminary final

Grand final

See also
Football NSW

References

External links
NSW Premier League Official Website

2006
2006 domestic association football leagues